de Vilallonga is a surname. Notable people with the surname include:

Jesús Carles de Vilallonga (born 1927), Catalan painter and sculptor
José Luis de Vilallonga (1920–2007), Spanish actor and writer
Rafaela Ybarra de Vilallonga (1843–1900), Beatified Spanish Catholic

See also
 Villalonga (disambiguation)